Peregrina is a Venezuelan telenovela created by Cuban writer Delia Fiallo and produced by Venevisión in 1973.

Rebeca González and José Bardina starred as the main protagonists.

Plot
In a Venezuelan town, a woman named Miriam suffering from leukemia dies while giving birth. Her husband Dr. Mirabal dies in an accident, and the young girl is left in the care of her maternal grandfather, Mendoza. But his wife and step-mother of the deceased Miriam want the Mendoza family fortune to remain with the twin sons, Juan Carlos and Rolando, born from Mendoza's first marriage. The evil step-mother then gives the child to a gypsy woman who is part of a circus that is passing through town.

Twenty years later, the girl Gisela has become a beautiful woman, and returns to the town of her birth with the circus. Mendoza and his sister Yolanda see her and realise that the gypsy girl has the same looks as his late daughter Miriam, and he realises that she is his long-lost granddaughter. Rolando who has grown ambitious as his mother, learns that Gisela is the heir to the Mendoza fortune, and plans on marrying her in order to possess her fortune. During their wedding night, Gisela discovers that Rolando doesn't love her. Heartbroken, Gisela leaves to return to the circus without knowing that Rolando was assassinated, and she is accused of the crime. Juan Carlos, Rolando's twin brother, believing Gisela murdered his brother, decides to carry out his revenge against her.

Cast

Rebeca González as Gisela / Miriam Mendoza
José Bardina as Juan Carlos Pallares / Rolando Pallares
Haydee Balza as Norma
Reneé de Pallás as Victoria
Eva Blanco as Yolanda
Betty Ruth as Aurora
José Luis Silva as Randu "El Tirano"
Luis Abreu as Manrique Alonso
Ana Castell as Celia
Esperanza Magaz as Dorinda
Nerón Rojas
Carlos Subero as Simon
Mary Soliani as Evita
Chumico Romero as Aisha
Oscar Mendoza as Glinka
Francisco Ferrari as Adolfo Zamora
José Oliva as Roberto
Enrique Alzugaray as Calunga
Francia Ortiz as Flora
Néstor Zavarce as Ruben
Caridad Canelón as Alina
Elio Roca as Herself
Julio Mota as Genaro
Lucila Herrera as Elvira
Soledad Rojas as Lazara
Guillermo Ferran as Efrain

References

External links

1973 telenovelas
Venevisión telenovelas
Spanish-language telenovelas
Venezuelan telenovelas
1973 Venezuelan television series debuts
1973 Venezuelan television series endings
Television shows set in Venezuela